Le Pont de l'Europe  (English title: The Europe Bridge) is an oil painting by French impressionist Gustave Caillebotte completed in 1876. The finished canvas measures .

Description
The plaza is a large bridge joining six avenues, each named for a European capital, over the railroad yards at Gare Saint-Lazare. One of the bridge's trusses is very prominent, visible in half of the image.

Three people are seen in the foreground: a couple walking toward the observer, and a working-class man peering off the bridge toward the train station. A dog walks away from the observer, and other individuals appear in the mid-background.  The man of the couple is a flâneur, an upper-class street observer. He is strolling with a woman dressed in black. She has often been interpreted to be a prostitute, according to contemporary social norms regarding women in public, especially in the area of the train station. Alternatively, the man has been thought to be Caillebotte himself, and the woman to be Caillebotte's companion, Anne-Marie Hagen. The flâneur is looking past his companion in the direction of the other man. Feminist art historian Norma Broude has suggested that Caillebotte, a lifelong bachelor, is signalling his own homosexuality with this gaze. In this reading, Caillebotte is an upper-class man cruising for a lower-class male prostitute in this unsavory neighborhood of Paris. However, Caillebotte's sexual orientation is not definitively known.

Caillebotte displayed this image at the impressionist exhibition of 1877, alongside his Rue de Paris, temps de pluie and Claude Monet's , which gives an alternate view of the bridge.

Caillebotte, as in many of his works, employs perspective. The vanishing point is located behind the head of the man, which is far to the side of the picture, creating oblique perspective. Caillebotte was influenced by Japanese art, especially the work of Hiroshige, and by photography, then a burgeoning artistic field. In turn, this painted composition may have been an influence in photographer Jeff Wall's work from 1982, Mimic, which features similar exaggerated perspective and class tension between the three similarly situated characters.

Gallery

Notes

References

Paintings by Gustave Caillebotte
1876 paintings
Paintings in Geneva
Dogs in art
Bridges in art